Kingdom of Heaven may refer to:

Religious
 Kingdom of Heaven (Gospel of Matthew)
Kingship and kingdom of God, or simply Kingdom of God, the phrase used in the other gospels
 Kingdom of Heaven (Daviesite), a schismatic sect, founded by William W. Davies, in the Latter Day Saint movement located near Walla Walla, Washington from 1867 to 1881

Songs
"Kingdom of Heaven", a song appearing on the 1966 album The Psychedelic Sounds of the 13th Floor Elevators by the 13th Floor Elevators
 "Kingdom of Heaven", a song by the band Epica, appearing on their 2009 album Design Your Universe

Other uses
 Kingdom of Heaven (film), a 2005 film, directed by Ridley Scott
 Kingdom of Heaven (soundtrack), a soundtrack album from the film

See also
 The Heavenly King (disambiguation)
 Republic of Heaven, opposing concept developed by Philip Pullman in the His Dark Materials series of novels
 Holy Rus, the religious and philosophical concept close to the idea of Kingdom of Heaven, prevalent in Russia and central Eurasia
 Taiping Heavenly Kingdom
 Embassy of Heaven